The Queen's Traitor is a 1967 British television series directed by Campbell Logan and starring Nigel Green, Susan Engel and Stephanie Beacham. It portrays the Ridolfi plot, an attempt to overthrow Queen Elizabeth I and replace her with Mary, Queen of Scots. Broadcast in five weekly parts, all episodes were later wiped and are thought to be lost.

References

External links

1967 British television series debuts
BBC television dramas
1960s British drama television series
1967 British television series endings